Alberto Bayo y Giroud (27 March 1892 – 4 August 1967) was a Cuban military commander of the Republican faction during the Spanish Civil War. His most significant action during the war was the attempted invasion of the Nationalist-held islands of Ibiza and Majorca at the Battle of Majorca. He was also a poet and essayist.

Biography 
He was born in Cuba and studied in the United States and Spain. In his youth he joined the Spanish Military Aviation. He had his first flight in 1916. He was expelled from the Aviation after taking part in a duel. He was then forced to join the Spanish Legion in 1924, and participated in the Moroccan War, which he stayed for two years as a company commander. In 1925 he was seriously wounded in the groin, spending a year in recovery. In 1926 he requested to return to Africa, and was assigned the 3rd battalion of the Mehal-la de Gómara – which was part of General Capaz's troops – taking part in heavy fighting until 1927.

He returned to the air force during the Second Spanish Republic and was stationed in administrative posts, but he was not promoted.

He was appointed as the 2nd Chief of Staff of the V Army Corps for the Battle of Brunete, Modesto, but the commander of the unit opposed this and Bayo was relieved. He was successively promoted to Commander and Lieutenant Colonel. He was going to be in charge of preparing a guerrilla column in the Sierra de Madrid, but finally the project was not carried out and Bayo spent most of the contest as a military attaché in the Ministry of War.

After that war was lost, Bayo had a furniture factory in Mexico, and is reported to have been an instructor at the Military Academy of Guadalajara. Bayo had contact in Mexico with prominent Latin American revolutionaries, and was associate and mentor of some, including Ernesto Che Guevara and Fidel Castro. He joined the guerrillas as an advisor and participated in the Cuban revolution. There he maintained a close friendship with Castro and Che Guevara. While it is not known if he continued contact with Soviet agents such as "Comandante Carlos Contreras" (Vittorio Vidali), both were present in Mexico at the same period.

Death 
Alberto Bayo died a General of the Cuban Armed Forces.

Bayo as author and poet
Cualquier cosilla (poetry), Spain, 1911
Mis cantos de aspirante (poetry), Spain, 1911
Cadetadas (poetry), Spain, 1912 
Canciones del Alkázar (poetry), Spain, 1914
Juan de Juanes (novel), Spain, 1926
Uncida al yugo (novel), Spain, 1926
Dos años en Gomara, Spain, 1928
La guerra será de los guerrilleros, Spain, 1937
El tenorio laico (poetry), Spain, 1938
Mi desembarco en Mallorca, Mexico, 1944
Tempestad en el Caribe, Mexico, 1950
Cámara, México (history), 1951
El caballero de los tristes destinos (capitán Alonso de Ojeda), México, 1953
Magallanes, el hombre más audaz de la tierra, Mexico, 1953
150 preguntas a un guerrillero, Mexico, 1955
Fidel te espera en la Sierra (poetry), Mexico, 1958
Mis versos de rebeldía, Mexico, 1958
Sangre en Cuba (poetry), Mexico, 1958
Mi aporte a la revolución cubana, 1960
El tenorio cubano (poetry), 1960
Versos revolucionarios, 130 pp, 1960
Mis versos,  223 pp, 1965

References

External links
Cubaliteraria: Albert Bayo 
wannadoo: Alberto Bayo 
El Ejército Popular Republicano 
España en Guerra   (.pdf)
Alberto Bayo: Gerilla Nedir?  

1892 births
1967 deaths
People from Camagüey
Cuban people of Spanish descent
Stalinism
Anti-revisionists
Cuban communists
Cuban male poets
Cuban soldiers
Spanish generals
Foreign volunteers in the Spanish Civil War
Unión Militar Republicana Antifascista members
Guerrilla warfare theorists
Cuban revolutionaries
People from Ibiza
Military history of Ibiza
People of the Cuban Revolution
20th-century Cuban poets